United Airlines Flight 823 was a scheduled flight from Philadelphia International Airport, Pennsylvania to Huntsville International Airport, Alabama with 39 on board. The fire of unknown origin occurred in the passenger cabin. One passenger abandoned the aircraft through the No.4 escape window prior to impact but did not survive the free-fall. Among the victims was Durant da Ponte, professor of American literature and assistant dean of the University of Tennessee graduate school.

The Aircraft Accident Report published by the Civil Aeronautics Board in June 1966—almost two years after the crash—stated that "The Board is unable to identify the source of fuel, the ignition point of the fire, or the cause of the final maneuver." The investigation found the probable cause was "an uncontrollable in-flight fire, of undetermined origin, in the fuselage, which resulted in a loss of control of the aircraft."

Approximately 33,000 lbs. of the 40,000 lb. (empty weight) airliner were recovered, with much of the missing weight attributable to cabin furnishings that were destroyed by fire. The wreckage was transported to the Naval Laboratory in Washington, D.C. where the Vickers was reconstructed by the Civil Aeronautics Board.

The accident triggered an investigation of the Lockheed L-109C flight data recorder which resulted in modifications of that device and revision of the standards for all recorders. Also addressed were potential problems with the Pyrene Duo Head Model DCD-10 fire extinguisher system for the underfloor baggage and heater compartments. There was an Airworthiness Directive issued. Revisions were made to the Pilot's Manual, Viscount Maintenance and Instruction, and Accessories Manuals.

The accident happened next to a farm owned by the family of Miss Mae Trentham, whose family helped the crash's rescue workers with water and food. The airplane had grazed the Trentham property before it crashed; the property became the unofficial headquarters of both rescuers and investigators.

References

External links
United 823

 Civil Aeronautics Board Accident Report United Airlines, Inc., Vickers Viscount 745D, N7405 rosap.ntlbts.gov Investigations of Aircraft Accidents 1934-1965
 
"39 Victims Of Airplane Crash Remembered 50 Years Later" The Greeneville Sun, July 9, 2014, Archived from the original on May 26, 2021

Further reading
Serling, Robert J. Loud and Clear. Garden City, New York: Doubleday & Company, Inc., 1969, pp 225–235. Library of Congress Catalog Card Number 68-22504

Airliner accidents and incidents caused by in-flight fires
Aviation accidents and incidents in the United States in 1964
1964 in Tennessee
Airliner accidents and incidents in Tennessee
Accidents and incidents involving the Vickers Viscount
Cocke County, Tennessee
823
July 1964 events in the United States